Bryan Sykes  is a Jamaican judge. He was appointed as the Chief Justice of Jamaica on 1 February 2018 and was sworn in on 1 March 2018.

References

External links
 The Supreme Court

Living people
20th-century Jamaican lawyers
Chief justices of Jamaica
Year of birth missing (living people)
21st-century Jamaican judges